Island Whirl (foaled  March 17, 1978) is an American Thoroughbred racehorse and the winner of the 1983 Whitney Handicap.

Career

Island Whirl's first race was on May 31, 1980, at Calder, where he came in 8th. It took him until his 3rd race on October 29, 1980, at Calder, to capture a win.

Island Whirl captured his first stakes win on September 4, 1981, at the  El Cajon Stakes. He then captured his second stakes win at the Super Derby at Louisiana Downs. 

Island Whirl captured his first graded race win on January 3, 1982, by winning the Malibu Stakes. He competed in multiple other graded races throughout 1982, but did not see another graded win until he won the 1982 Woodward Stakes on September 4. His wins throughout 1982 helped him gain entry to the 1982 Jockey Club Gold Cup, where he placed 4th.

During the summer of 1983, Island Whirl picked up two major graded wins in a row by winning the 1983 [Hollywood Gold Cup @ Hollywood Park
] and the 1983 Whitney Handicap, which turned out to be the last wins of his career.

He finished off his career with a second-place finish at the 1983  Monmouth Handicap and a fifth-place finish at the 1983 Woodward Stakes on September 3, 1983.

Pedigree

References

1978 racehorse births